William Bickley may refer to:

William E. Bickley (1914–2010), American entomologist